Erynnis meridianus, the meridian duskywing, is a species of spread-wing skipper in the butterfly family Hesperiidae. It is found in Central America and North America.

Subspecies
These two subspecies belong to the species Erynnis meridianus:
 Erynnis meridianus fieldi Burns, 1964 c g
 Erynnis meridianus meridianus E. Bell, 1927 i g
Data sources: i = ITIS, c = Catalogue of Life, g = GBIF, b = Bugguide.net

References

Further reading

 
 

Erynnis
Articles created by Qbugbot
Butterflies described in 1927